Muhsin ibn Qaid, (Muhsin 'iibn Qayd) was the ruler of the Hammadids from 1054 to 1055. 

Hammadids
1055 deaths
Year of birth unknown
11th-century rulers in Africa
11th-century Berber people